Jim Mark Czajkowski (born December 18, 1963) is a former Major League Baseball pitcher who played for one season. He pitched for the Colorado Rockies in five games during the 1994 Colorado Rockies season.

In 2012, Czajkowski was the pitching coach for the Toronto Blue Jays' Northwest League affiliate Vancouver Canadians.

On January 13, 2014, Czajkowski was named as the pitching coach for the Toronto Blue Jays Double-A affiliate New Hampshire Fisher Cats.

Czajkowski was announced as the pitching coach for the Class A-Advanced Dunedin Blue Jays in 2019. He had previously coached there in 2016.

Czajowski was named the pitching coach for the Double A New Hampshire Fisher Cats for the 2021 season. He would remain the pitching coach for the Fisher Cats until September 2022.

References

External links

1963 births
Living people
Major League Baseball pitchers
Baseball players from Ohio
Colorado Rockies players
North Alabama Lions baseball players
Idaho Falls Braves players
Sumter Braves players
Durham Bulls players
Greenville Braves players
Salem Buccaneers players
Beloit Brewers players
Stockton Ports players
Harrisburg Senators players
El Paso Diablos players
Iowa Cubs players
Orlando Cubs players
Colorado Springs Sky Sox players
Syracuse Chiefs players
Knoxville Smokies players
Syracuse SkyChiefs players
People from Parma, Ohio